The  is a  railway line operated by the third-sector railway operating company Shinano Railway in Nagano Prefecture, Japan, since 14 March 2015 following the opening of the Hokuriku Shinkansen extension north of Nagano and transfer of operations of the former Shinetsu Main Line from East Japan Railway Company (JR East). It connects Nagano Station in Nagano with Myōkō-Kōgen Station in Myōkō, Niigata.

Service outline
All services on the line are all-stations  driver-only operation trains. From the start of operations on the line, there are 21 return workings daily between Nagano and Jōetsumyōkō, and three return workings daily between Nagano and Toyono, an increase in two return services daily compared with JR East operations prior to March 2015. In addition to Shinano Railway services, JR East Iiyama Line through-running services to and from Nagano also use the section of the line between Nagano and Toyono. At Myōkō-Kōgen, the northern end of the line, a cross-platform transfer is provided to the Echigo Tokimeki Railway Myōkō Haneuma Line continuing northward along the former Shinetsu Main Line, with Shinano Railway trains normally using platform 2 and Echigo Tokimeki Railway trains normally using platform 3.

Stations

Rolling stock

Services are operated using 115 series electric multiple unit (EMU) trains transferred from JR East.

History
The name of the line was chosen in March 2013 following a public ballot.

See also
List of railway lines in Japan

References

External links 

  

 
Railway lines in Japan
Railway lines in Nagano Prefecture
1067 mm gauge railways in Japan
Railway lines opened in 2015
2015 establishments in Japan
Japanese third-sector railway lines